Moulay Hafid Elalamy (born January 13, 1960) is a Moroccan businessman and politician. He is the founder and owner of the Saham Group. He served as the Minister of Industry, Trade, & New Technologies until 2021.

Early life
Moulay Hafid Elalamy was born on January 13, 1960, in Marrakesh, Morocco. He graduated from the Université de Sherbrooke in Sherbrooke, Quebec.

Career
Elalamy is the founder and owner of the Saham Group. Its subsidiary, CNIA Saada, is the largest insurance company in Morocco. Other subsidiaries include call centers, and clinics.

He served as the Minister of Industry, Trade, & New Technologies until 2021.

As of 2014, he was worth an estimated US$620 million according to Forbes.

Elalamy was the chairman of Morocco's bid for the 2026 FIFA World Cup but lost out to Canada/Mexico/United States on June 13, 2018, in Moscow by 69 votes with 134-65.

Personal life
He is married. He resides in Casablanca, Morocco.

References

Living people
1960 births
People from Marrakesh
People from Casablanca
Université de Sherbrooke alumni
Moroccan businesspeople
Businesspeople in insurance
Government ministers of Morocco